Campnosperma zeylanicum is a species of plant in the family Anacardiaceae. It is endemic to Sri Lanka.

Culture
Known as අරිද්ද (aridda) in Sinhala.

References

zeylanicum
Endemic flora of Sri Lanka
Trees of Sri Lanka
Vulnerable flora of Asia
Taxonomy articles created by Polbot
Taxobox binomials not recognized by IUCN